Vobkent District is a district of Bukhara Region in Uzbekistan. The capital lies at the city Vobkent.

The district consists of 1 city (Vobkent), 3 urban-type settlements (Navbahor, Shirin, Kosari) and 11 rural communities.

References

External links
 Vabkent article on WikiMir

Bukhara Region
Districts of Uzbekistan